Wenhua Senior High School is a metro station on the Green Line operated by Taichung Metro in Xitun District, Taichung, Taiwan.

National Wen-Hua Senior High School, the station's namesake, is located nearby. A mixed-use building is being construction in conjunction to the north of the station and will be connected by a bridge.

Station layout

References 

Taichung Metro
Railway stations in Taichung
Railway stations opened in 2020